A list of films produced by the Bollywood film industry based in Mumbai in 1996.

Top-grossing films

Released films

References

External links
 Bollywood films of 1996 at the Internet Movie Database

1996
Lists of 1996 films by country or language
 Bollywood
1996 in Indian cinema